The Sor Juana Inés de la Cruz Prize (Premio Sor Juana Inés de la Cruz) is a literary prize awarded to a book written in Spanish by a female author. It is organized by the Guadalajara International Book Fair, based in Guadalajara, Jalisco, Mexico. Current winners of the prize receive USD$10,000.

History
This prize is named after the 17th century Mexican writer, Sor Juana Inés de la Cruz who is considered the first great Latin American poet and one of the most important Hispanic literary figures. Sor Juana was persecuted for being an intellectual, a woman, a nun, and a writer who wrote quite provocatively.

The prize has been given out since 1993, and is given out at the yearly Guadalajara International Book Fair (Feria Internacional del Libro de Guadalajara).

Winners
 2022: Daniela Tarazona (Mexico) Isla partida
 2021: Fernanda Trías (Uruguay) Mugre rosa
 2020: Camila Sosa Villada (Argentina) Las malas
 2019: Maria Gainza (Argentina) La luz negra
 2018: Clara Usón (Spain) El asesino tímido
 2017: Nona Fernández (Chile) La dimensión desconocida
 2016: Marina Perezagua (Spain) Yoro
 2015: Perla Suez (Argentina) El país del diablo
 2014: Inés Fernández Moreno (Argentina) El cielo no existe
 2013: Ana García Bergua (Mexico) La bomba de San José
 2012: Lina Meruane (Chile) Sangre en el Ojo (translated by Megan McDowell as Seeing Red)
 2011: Almudena Grandes (Spain) Inés y la alegría
 2010: Claudia Piñeiro (Argentina) Las grietas de Jara (translated by Miranda France as A Crack in the Wall)
 2009: Cristina Rivera Garza (Mexico) La muerte me da
 2008: Gioconda Belli (Nicaragua) El Infinito en la palma de la mano (translated by Margaret Sayers Peden as Infinity in the Palm of Her Hand) 
 2007: Tununa Mercado Yo nunca te prometí la eternidad
 2006: Claudia Amengual (Uruguay) Desde las cenizas
 2005: Paloma Villegas Agosto y fuga (August Escape)
 2004: Cristina Sánchez-Andrade Ya no pisa la tierra tu rey
 2003: Margo Glantz El rastro
 2002: Ana Gloria Moya Cielo de tambores (Sky of Drums)
 2001: Cristina Rivera Garza  Nadie me verá llorar
 1999: Sylvia Iparraguirre La tierra del fuego
 1998: Silvia Molina El amor que me juraste (translated by David Unger as The Love You Promised Me) 
 1997: Laura Restrepo Dulce compañía (translated by Dolores M. Koch as The Angel of Galilea)
 1996:
Elena Garro Busca mi esquela (translated as Look for My Obituary)
Alicia Yánez Cossío El cristo feo (ex-aequo)
 1995: Tatiana Lobo Asalto al paraíso (translated by Asa Zatz as Assault on Paradise)
 1994: Marcela Serrano Nosotras que nos queremos tanto
 1993: Angelina Muñiz-Huberman Dulcinea encantada

See also
 List of literary awards honoring women

References

External links
 Premio de Literatura Sor Juana Inés de la Cruz at the Guadalajara International Book Fair

Mexican literary awards
Spanish-language literary awards
Literary awards honoring women
Awards established in 2004
2004 establishments in Mexico